Honorable Mr. Justice Mukhtar Ahmad Junejo (2 September 1930 - 13 June 2017) was a former judge of The Supreme Court of Pakistan. He also became the acting Chief Election Commissioner of Pakistan.

He was justice of The Supreme Court of Pakistan between October 19, 1994 and February 19, 1998, till he retired from office.

References

1.http://www.ecp.gov.pk/content/Report97President.html

2.http://www.southeastasianews.net/story/293283

https://www.webcitation.org/query?url=http://www.geocities.com/CollegePark/Library/9803/cowasjee/fascism_iii.html&date=2009-10-25+06:59:38

Pakistani judges
1940 births
2017 deaths
People from Dadu District